Andrea Joan Caron Lynch (born November 24, 1952) is a British former track and field sprinter who competed mainly in the 100 metres. A two-time Olympian, the peak of her career was becoming a bronze medallist in the 100 m at the 1974 European Championships and a double silver medallist in the 100 m and 4 × 100 metres relay at the 1974 British Commonwealth Games. A former British record holder in the 100 m, she has a hand-timed best of 10.9 seconds in 1974 and an auto-timed best of 11.16 secs in 1975. Her 200 metres best is 23.15 secs in 1975.

Career
Born in Barbados, she moved to England with her family at a young age. She would later apply to represent the country of her birth for the 1970 British Commonwealth Games, but decided to compete for Britain after she failed to receive a response. She proved herself as a young sprinter for Britain, winning at the English Schools' Athletics Championships over 100 m in 1970 and over 200 metres in 1971. She was the 100 m winner at the 1970 British Schools International Match. Her first major medal came at the 1970 European Athletics Junior Championships, being 100 m silver medallist behind Poland's Helena Kerner.

In 1974 she equalled the world record for the 60 metres, running 7.2 seconds. She had some of her greatest successes in that indoor event, winning the gold medal at the 1975 European Athletics Indoor Championships, having previously won a silver at the competition in 1974.

Lynch represented Great Britain at the Olympics in 1972 and 1976. In her first appearance, while still a teenager, she was a semi-finalist in the 100 m and was seventh in the 4 × 100 metres relay. Returning four years later, she made the Olympic 100 metres final and placed seventh, as well as making the relay final.

The following year she was runner-up to Renate Stecher at the 1975 European Cup and took her last major individual medals at the 1977 Universiade (a 100 m silver and 200 m bronze). Her only global level medal came with the European relay team at the 1977 IAAF World Cup, where she teamed up with national rival Sonia Lannaman and West Germany's Annegret Richter and Elvira Possekel to claim the gold.

At national level she won three 100 m title at the AAA Championships and three 60 m titles at the AAA Indoor Championships (1973, 1975 and 1976). She was runner-up in both 100 m and 200 m to Sonia Lannaman at the inaugural 1977 UK Athletics Championships. She also competed as a guest at the Scottish Athletics Championships in 1972 and won both short sprints.

After retiring from competitive athletics, she remained involved with the sport and took up sprint coaching, including top ranked national junior sprinter Kyle Reynolds-Warmington at Belgrave Harriers.

She was formerly married to Canadian Olympic sprinter Brian Saunders.

International competitions

National titles
AAA Championships
100 metres: 1973, 1975, 1976
AAA Indoor Championships
60 metres: 1973, 1975, 1976
Scottish Athletics Championships
100 metres: 1972
200 metres: 1972

See also
List of European Athletics Championships medalists (women)
List of European Athletics Indoor Championships medalists (women)
List of 100 metres national champions (women)

References

External links

Living people
1952 births
English female sprinters
Olympic athletes of Great Britain
Athletes (track and field) at the 1972 Summer Olympics
Athletes (track and field) at the 1976 Summer Olympics
Commonwealth Games medallists in athletics
Commonwealth Games silver medallists for England
Athletes (track and field) at the 1974 British Commonwealth Games
European Athletics Championships medalists
World record setters in athletics (track and field)
English athletics coaches
Female sports coaches
Black British sportswomen
Barbadian emigrants to England
Universiade medalists in athletics (track and field)
Universiade silver medalists for Great Britain
Universiade bronze medalists for Great Britain
Medalists at the 1977 Summer Universiade
Olympic female sprinters
Medallists at the 1974 British Commonwealth Games